= Vehicle registration plates of Burkina Faso =

The vehicle registration plates of Burkina Faso is a legal form requiring the citizens of Burkina Faso to have their cars registered.

== Regular plates ==
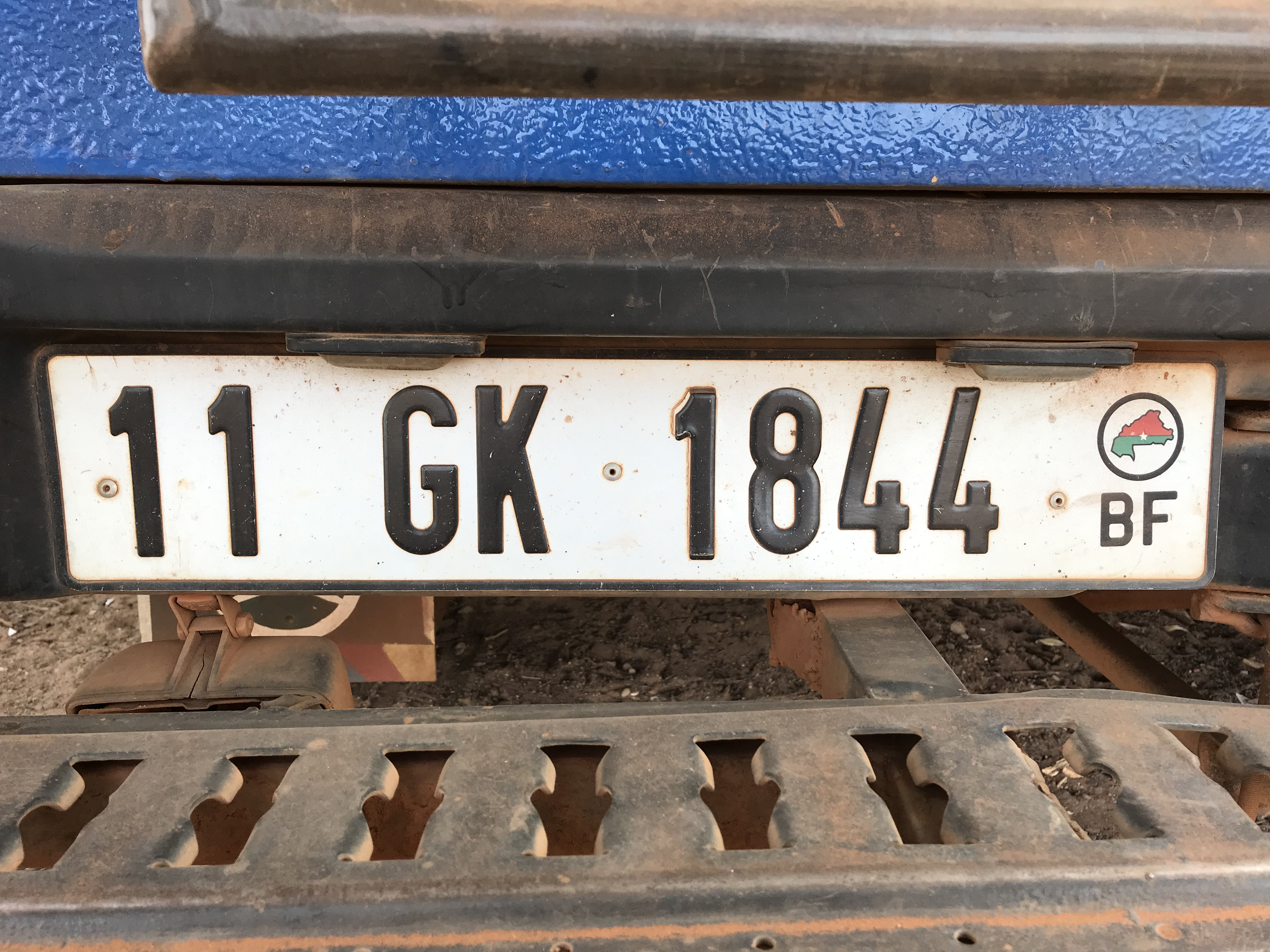
Regular plates since 1995

Burkinabè license plates follow a format that came into effect in 1984.

They are composed of 2 digits, 2 letters, 4 digits. Example: 12 AB 1234.

== Commercial license plate ==
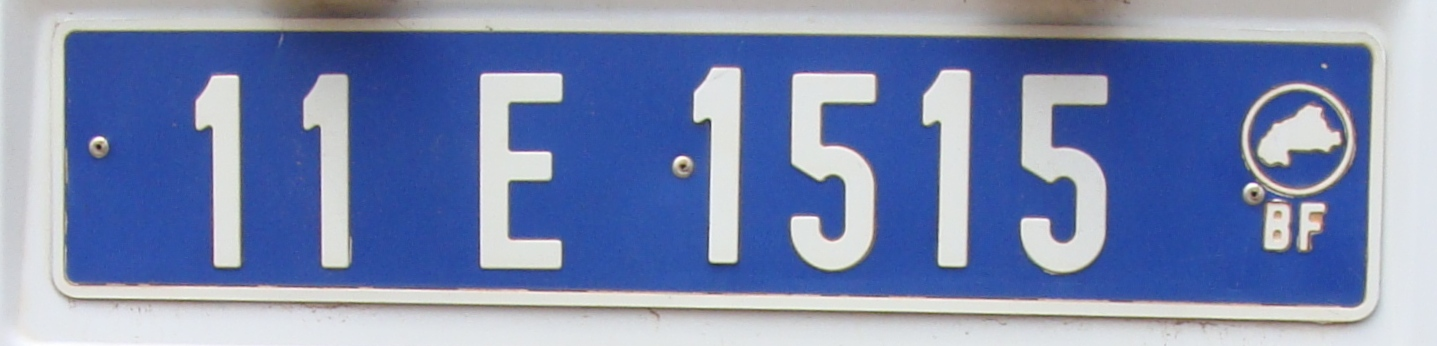
Commercial license plates

Commercial license plates are composed of 2 digits, 1 letter, 4 digits. example: 12-A-1234, with a blue background and white text.

== Police ==
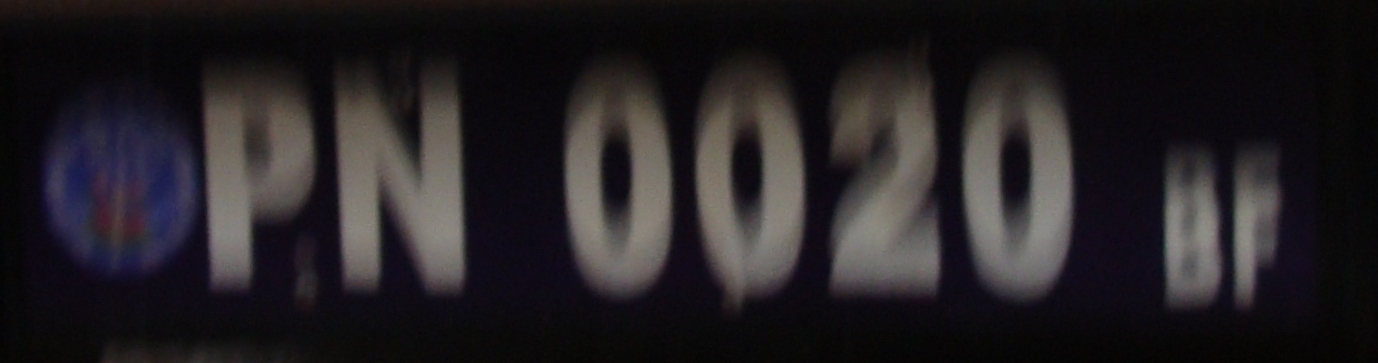
Police plates

Burkinabe police license plates are composed of 2 letters, 4 numbers. example: PN - 1234 (PN = National Police).

== Gendarmerie ==
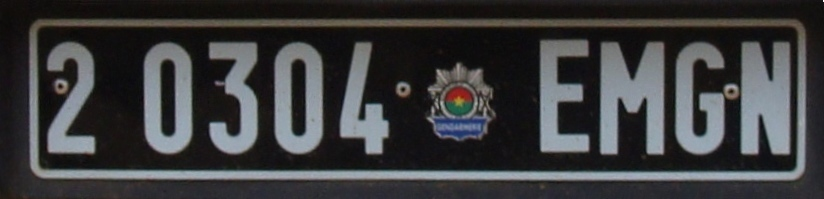
Gendarmerie license plates

The Burkinabe gendarmerie license plates are composed of 1 number, 4 numbers, 4 letters. example: 1-2345 • EMGN (GN = National Gendarmerie).
